Éric Poujade (born 8 August 1972) is a French former gymnast who competed in the 1996 Summer Olympics and in the 2000 Summer Olympics.

References

1972 births
Living people
French male artistic gymnasts
Olympic gymnasts of France
Gymnasts at the 1996 Summer Olympics
Gymnasts at the 2000 Summer Olympics
Olympic silver medalists for France
Olympic medalists in gymnastics
Medalists at the 2000 Summer Olympics
Medalists at the World Artistic Gymnastics Championships
20th-century French people